Euodia is a plant genus in the family Rutaceae.  Euodia is sometimes misspelled as Evodia. The species now included in the genus Tetradium were previously included in Euodia, and may be commonly referred to as euodia.

Fossil record
Fossil seeds of Euodia costata have been recovered from Eocene sediments at Hordle, Hants, southern England. A fossil species, Euodia lignita, has been described from Oligocene Brandon Lignite sediments in Vermont, United States.

Species
 Euodia elleryana 
 Euodia hortensis J.R.Forst. & G.Forst.
 Euodia hylandii
 Euodia lunuankenda
 Euodia macrocarpa
 Euodia pubifolia
 Euodia robusta
 Euodia schullei Warb.
 Euodia simplicifolia
 Euodia tietaensis
 Euodia vitiflora

Former species
 Euodia hupehensis: is now classed as Tetradium daniellii var. hupehensis

Former species
 Euodia ruticarpa, now Tetradium ruticarpum
 Euodia micrococca, now Melicope micrococca

References

External links

 Euodia on eFloras 

 
Zanthoxyloideae genera